Bag of Trix (subtitled Music from the Roxette Vaults) is the third box set compilation by Swedish pop duo Roxette. It was issued physically by Roxette Recordings and Parlophone on 11 December 2020, as a quadruple LP and triple CD set. The record consists of 47 tracks, 28 of which are previously unreleased, and features demos, alternate mixes, bonus tracks, live recordings and Spanish-language versions. Also included are several radio versions of singles, including Brian Malouf's CHR mix of "Joyride", which was the version predominantly played on US radio when the track peaked at number one on the Billboard Hot 100 in May 1991.

The record was dedicated to Marie Fredriksson, and was issued physically two days after the first anniversary of her death. It contains eleven songs either written or co-written by her. Prior to its physical release, the compilation was issued digitally in volumes from 30 October; these volumes were released in two week intervals, and utilised the track listings found on the vinyl editions.

Four singles were issued from the album: a version of the Beatles song "Help!" recorded at Abbey Road Studios in 1995, the Baladas en Español outtake "Tú No Me Comprendes", and two outtakes from the band's final studio album Good Karma, "Let Your Heart Dance with Me" and "Piece of Cake".

Release and promotion
Four songs were issued as singles prior to the release of the album. A cover version of the Beatles song "Help!" – originally recorded in 1995 at Abbey Road Studios – was issued as the lead single in May 2020. This recording remained unreleased for several years before finally appearing on the 2006 box set The Rox Box/Roxette 86–06. Per Gessle, a dedicated Beatles fan, said of the cover: "When we were in Abbey Road we could not help but make our own version of 'Help!'. It was a great day, pop history in all corners of the studio and a fantastic feeling to be part of Abbey Road's unimaginable legacy." The duo also recorded versions of three previous singles at Abbey Road: "Listen to Your Heart", "The Look" and "You Don't Understand Me", all of which appear on Bag of Trix.

The Good Karma outtake "Let Your Heart Dance with Me" was released as a single on 2 October. A music video was created, using footage compiled from Gessle and Fredriksson's private archives, and a limited edition gold-coloured 7" vinyl was released on 9 October. It contained their cover of "Help!" as the b-side. This was followed on 6 November by "Tú No Me Comprendes", a previously unreleased version of their 1995 single "You Don't Understand Me" originally recorded for their Spanish-language compilation Baladas en Español in 1996. Another Good Karma outtake, "Piece of Cake", was released on 20 November. Music videos were also created for the preceding two singles, both consisting of archive footage.

Critical reception

A writer for Sweden's largest newspaper Aftonbladet said the album demonstrates how Fredriksson and Gessle were "intensely passionate about the music they made, and had a lot of fun together in the meantime". They praised the demo version of "Hotblooded" as one of the "most joyful" songs Roxette ever recorded, saying the track sounds "spontaneous and playful, even if their musical perfection is still present." They also praised Fredriksson's vocals, saying it "does not matter how many times you have heard it before, you can still and consistently be struck by Marie Fredriksson's enormous voice. The sharpness in it is striking, especially in the live recording of the ballad 'Cry' from Norrköping in the winter of 1988. It is one of the album's main gems, because it so nicely captures the audience's great reaction." They summarised by describing the compilation as "not being about the band's best or most beautiful recordings. The collection has a different, more nostalgic value. Above all, it is an opportunity for fans to get close to Roxette for perhaps the last time."

Formats and track listings
All songs written by Per Gessle, except where noted.

Vinyl and digital track listing

CD track listing

Notes
  signifies a co-producer

Personnel
Credits adapted from Tidal.

 Marie Fredriksson – lead and background vocals, keyboards, engineering, production and mixing
 Per Gessle – lead and background vocals, guitars, engineering, production and mixing
 Per "Pelle" Alsing – drums
 Mikael Bolyos – instrumentation, engineering, production and mixing (Studio Vinden and Skinnarviksringen sessions); additional engineering ("Cooper")
 Jonas Isacsson – acoustic, bass and electric guitars
 Christer Jansson – percussion ("It Will Take a Long Long Time"); cymbals and drums ("Quisiera Volar"); drums, tambourine and percussion ("Cooper" and "Alguien")
 Christoffer Lundquist – engineering, production and mixing ("Let Your Heart Dance with Me" and "Piece of Cake"); bass guitar and background vocals ("Lo Siento", "Quisiera Volar" and "Alguien"); zither ("It Will Take a Long Long Time", "Cooper" and "Alguien"); guitar, drums and tambourine ("Alguien")
 Clarence Öfwerman – piano, keyboards, synthesizer, bells, tambourine, programming, arrangements, engineering, production and mixing
 Mats "MP" Persson – instrumentation and engineering (T&A sessions); twelve-string guitar and additional engineering ("It Will Take a Long Long Time"); string arrangement ("Quisiera Volar"); programming, mixing and additional engineering ("Cooper")

Technical personnel
 Addeboy vs. Cliff – co-production ("Let Your Heart Dance with Me" and "Piece of Cake")
 Michael Ilbert – engineering and production ("Lo Siento", "It Will Take a Long Long Time", "Quisiera Volar", "The Centre of the Heart", "Cooper" and "Alguien"); programming ("It Will Take a Long Long Time" and "Quisiera Volar"); string arrangement ("Quisiera Volar")
 Alar Suurna – engineering and mixing

Additional personnel
 Micke "Nord" Andersson – twelve string acoustic and Rickenbacker guitars ("Quisiera Volar")
 Magnus Blom – alto saxophone ("Alguien")
 Tommy Cassemar – bass guitar ("Soul Deep")
 Hasse Dyvik – trumpet and flugelhorn ("Alguien")
 Anders Evaldsson – trombone ("Alguien")
 Uno Forsberg – trumpet ("Soul Deep")
 Lennart Haglund – engineering assistant ("It Will Take a Long Long Time" and "Cooper")
 Mats Holmquist – conducting ("It Will Take a Long Long Time", "Quisiera Volar", "Cooper" and "Alguien")
 Jonas Knutsson – soprano saxophone ("I Was So Lucky")
 Ronny Lahti – mixing ("Let Your Heart Dance with Me")
 Brian Malouf – mixing ("Joyride")
 George Marino – mastering engineer ("It Will Take a Long Long Time", "Quisiera Volar", "Cooper" and "Alguien")
 Mats Persson – percussion ("Soul Deep")
 Mikael Renlinden – trumpet ("Soul Deep")
 Tomas Sjörgen – trumpet ("Soul Deep")
 Stockholms Nya Kammarorkester (credited as SNYKO) – strings ("It Will Take a Long Long Time", "Quisiera Volar", "Cooper" and "Alguien")
 Robert Wellerfors – engineering ("Soul Deep")

Charts

Release history

References

2020 compilation albums
Roxette compilation albums
Parlophone compilation albums
Compilation albums published posthumously